Bibiana Vélez Alzate (born 7 June 1983) is a Colombian female artistic gymnast, representing her nation at international competitions, including at the 2014 World Artistic Gymnastics Championships.

References

1983 births
Living people
Colombian female artistic gymnasts
Place of birth missing (living people)
Gymnasts at the 2003 Pan American Games
Pan American Games competitors for Colombia
Gymnasts at the 2007 Pan American Games
Gymnasts at the 2011 Pan American Games
Gymnasts at the 2015 Pan American Games
Central American and Caribbean Games bronze medalists for Colombia
South American Games gold medalists for Colombia
South American Games silver medalists for Colombia
South American Games bronze medalists for Colombia
South American Games medalists in gymnastics
Competitors at the 2006 South American Games
Competitors at the 2010 South American Games
Competitors at the 2014 South American Games
Competitors at the 2014 Central American and Caribbean Games
Central American and Caribbean Games medalists in gymnastics
20th-century Colombian women
21st-century Colombian women